Emmanuel Mbola (born 10 May 1993), is a Zambian professional footballer who plays for Nkana. He is left-footed, and plays primarily at left-back. Between 2008 and 2016, he made 54 appearances for the Zambian national team.

Club career
Born in Kabwe Mbola began his career 2007 with Zambian club Mining Rangers and in 2008 joined another Zambian club Zanaco. In January 2009 he was scouted by Armenian club Pyunik Yerevan and joined them. He became the first Zambian to feature in the Uefa Champions League, representing his new club in a 0–0 draw v Dinamo Zagreb on 14 July 2009.

Linked in February 2010 with a move to English club Tottenham Hotspur and having been on trial at Arsenal in autumn 2010 he was involved in an ongoing transfer saga over his move to Pyunik Yerevan and a subsequent move to a Congolese club, TP Mazembe. This was resolved in September 2010 when FIFA ruled that the Armenian club had been wrong in arranging for Mbola to sign a professional contract when he was underage, which resulted in FIFA canceling the International Transfer Certificate (ITC) held by the Armenian club. This ruling meant that Mbola could officially join TP Mazembe.

He signed a one-year loan deal with Portuguese side Porto in February 2012. On 2 September 2013, Mbola signed for Israel Premier League side Hapoel Ra'anana A.F.C.

International career
He is also a member of Zambian national team, having participated in 26 international matches since his debut in 2008 and is considered one of the most promising talents in Zambian and African football. Mbola is the second youngest player to have played a match in the Africa Cup of Nations.

Achievements
Armenian Cup with Pyunik Yerevan: 2009
Armenian Premier League with Pyunik Yerevan: 2009

References

External links
 
 
 

1993 births
Living people
Zambian footballers
Zambia international footballers
Zambian expatriate footballers
Association football fullbacks
Zanaco F.C. players
FC Pyunik players
TP Mazembe players
FC Porto players
Hapoel Ra'anana A.F.C. players
Bnei Sakhnin F.C. players
Nkana F.C. players
Expatriate footballers in Armenia
Expatriate footballers in Portugal
Expatriate footballers in Israel
Expatriate footballers in the Democratic Republic of the Congo
Zambian expatriate sportspeople in Armenia
Zambian expatriate sportspeople in Portugal
Zambian expatriate sportspeople in Israel
Zambian expatriate sportspeople in the Democratic Republic of the Congo
Armenian Premier League players
Israeli Premier League players
2010 Africa Cup of Nations players
2013 Africa Cup of Nations players
2015 Africa Cup of Nations players
People from Kabwe District
Zambia A' international footballers
2009 African Nations Championship players